The 1965 New Jersey gubernatorial election was held on November 2, 1965. Incumbent Democrat Richard J. Hughes defeated Republican nominee Wayne Dumont with 57.39% of the vote. The gubernatorial elections from 1953 to 1965 are the last in New Jersey in which any party won more than two consecutive elections.

Primary elections
Primary elections were held on June 1, 1965.

Democratic primary

Candidates
Richard J. Hughes, incumbent Governor
William H. Clark

Results

Republican primary

Candidates
Wayne Dumont, State Senator from Warren County
Charles W. Sandman, Jr., State Senator from Cape May County
Harold P. Poeschel

Results

General election

Candidates
Major party candidates
Richard J. Hughes, Democratic
Wayne Dumont, Republican

Other candidates
Robert Lee Schlachter, Conservative
Christopher C. Vespucci, Veterans Choice
Julius Levin, Socialist Labor Party of America
Ruth F. Shiminsky, Socialist Workers

Results

References

1965
New Jersey
Gubernatorial
November 1965 events in the United States